WPDX-FM (104.9 FM) is a classic country formatted broadcast radio station licensed to Clarksburg, West Virginia, serving the North-Central West Virginia area.  WPDX is owned by West Virginia Radio Corporation and operated under their AJG Corporation licensee.

History
WPDX-FM began broadcasting March 11, 1948, on 95.1 MHz. The station was licensed to the Clarksburg Broadcasting Corporation.

References

External links
Classic Country 104.9 Online

PDX-FM